Dynein axonemal intermediate chain 2 also known as axonemal dynein intermediate chain 2, is a protein that in humans is encoded by the DNAI2 gene.

Function 

The protein encoded by this gene belongs to the dynein intermediate chain family, and is part of the dynein complex of respiratory cilia and sperm flagella.

Clinical significance 

Mutations in the DNAI2 gene are associated with primary ciliary dyskinesia.

References

External links
 GeneReviews/NCBI/NIH/UW entry on Primary Ciliary Dyskinesia